Park Chung-hwi (Hangul: 박정휘; 1909 – 1985) was a South Korean football player and manager.

In 1948, he became the first manager of the South Korea national football team.

References

External links

1909 births
1985 deaths
South Korean footballers
Year of death missing
Association footballers not categorized by position
South Korean football managers
South Korea national football team managers